Charles Isidore Douin (1858 – 1944) was a French bryologist who was a native of Bouville, Eure-et-Loir.

Biography 
He taught school in Chartres, and was the author of a highly regarded work on mosses and liverworts titled Nouvelle flore des mousses et des hépatiques pour la détermination facile des espèces (1892). He also published a book involving bryology of Eure-et-Loir, Muscinées d'Eure-et-Loir (1906).

The liverwort genus Douinia from the family Scapaniaceae is named in his honor in 1928.

References 
 Parts of this article are based on a translation of an equivalent article at the French Wikipedia.

1858 births
1944 deaths
People from Eure-et-Loir
20th-century French botanists
Bryologists
19th-century French botanists